Richard Beatniffe (1740–1818) was an English bookseller and author.

Early life
Beatniffe was born in 1740 in Louth, Lincolnshire, and was adopted and educated by his uncle, the Rev. Samuel Beatniffe, rector of Gaywood and Bawsey in Norfolk. He was apprenticed to a bookseller at Lynn of the name of Hollingworth, who was in the habit of taking four apprentices. When we are told that all the four were expected to sleep in one bed, that the sheets were changed only once a year, and that the youths were dieted in the most economical manner, it says much for the sturdiness of Beatniffe that he was the only apprentice Hollingworth had for forty years who remained to serve his full-time. The temptations of the hand of his master's daughter, who was deformed in person and unpleasing in manners, together with a share in the business, were not able to retain Beatniffe in Lynn. Upon the termination of his apprenticeship he went to Norwich, and worked there for some years as a journeyman bookbinder. His old master Hollingworth, if harsh, must have been also generous, since he advanced Beatniffe £500. for the purchase of the stock of Jonathan Gleed, a bookseller of London Lane, in Norwich.

Writing and bookselling
Shortly after this period Beatniffe produced his excellent little Norfolk Tour, or Traveller's Pocket Companion, being a concise description of all the noblemen's and gentlemen's seats, as well as of the principal towns and other remarkable places in the county, of which the first edition appeared in 1772, the second in 1773, the third in 1777, the fourth in 1786, the fifth in 1795, and the sixth and last in 1808, "greatly enlarged and improved". This edition was 399 pages, about four times the size of the first. In the advertisement the author states that he had carefully revised every page, "and by the friendly communications of several gentlemen in the county and [his] own observations during the last ten years greatly enlarged" it. Improvements and additions were made by the author to each successive edition, and most of the places described were personally visited. It is written in a plain manner, and is full of information. Mr. W. Rye says: 

His biographer tells some characteristic anecdotes of the bookseller's unyielding toryism, of his rebuffs to chaffering customers, and of his unwillingness to supply the London trade. He preferred to sell to private buyers, and indeed was often loth to part with his "jewels", as he styled his rarities.

William Beloe, who knew him, has described Beatniffe as 
 
Booksellers have often thought it necessary to cultivate blunt and eccentric manners; but Beatniffe's knowledge of books, skill as a bookbinder, and business habits, made him a prosperous tradesman. For many years he owned the best collection of old books among provincial dealers, and was long the first secondhand bookseller in Norwich. He published a few works. His first catalogue was printed in 1779, and his last in 1808; they contained many rare volumes, which he knew how to price at their full value. Among the libraries purchased by him was that of the Rev. Dr. Cox Macro, of Little Haugh in Suffolk, who died in 1767, after having brought together a rich treasure of early-printed books, old poetry, original letters, and autographs. The library remained unexamined for forty years, when it came into Beatniffe's hands at the commencement of the century for the small sum of £150 or £160. On being sold piecemeal the collection realised nine or ten times as much.

Having amassed a considerable fortune, Beatniffe retired from business a short time before his death, which took place 9 July 1818, age seventy-nine, at Norwich. He was buried in the nave of the Norwich church of St. Peter at Mancroft.

Family
Beatniffe married Martha Dinah Hart, who died in 1816, daughter of a writing-master and alderman of Bury St. Edmund's, by whom he had a son and a daughter.

Notes

References
Attribution
; Endnotes:
Biography by the Rev. James Ford in Nichols's Illustrations, vi. 522–8
see also iv. 746, viii. 491
Nichols's Lit. Anecdotes, iii. 672, viii. 467, ix. 365
Gentlemen's Magazine 1818, ii. 93, 286.

1740 births
1818 deaths
English booksellers
People from Louth, Lincolnshire